Rescuers: Portraits of Moral Courage in the Holocaust is a 1992 book by Gay Block and Malka Drucker.

In 1986 rabbis Harold Schulweis, Malka Drucker and portrait artist Gay Block decided to document activities of non-Jewish Europeans who risked torture and death to save Jews during the Holocaust, a topic they considered both important and under-publicized. Their work would eventually led to a book (Rescuers: Portraits of Moral Courage in the Holocaust), as well as an exhibition of Block's photographs.

References 

1992 non-fiction books
Books about the Holocaust
Rescue of Jews during the Holocaust